"Miami Vice Theme" is a musical piece composed and performed by Jan Hammer as the theme to the television series Miami Vice. It was first presented as part of the television broadcast of the show in September 1984, was released as a single in 1985, and peaked at number one on the Billboard Hot 100. It was the last instrumental to top the Hot 100 until 2013, when "Harlem Shake" by Baauer reached number one. "Miami Vice Theme" also peaked at number five in the UK and number four in Canada. In 1986, it won Grammy Awards for "Best Instrumental Composition" and "Best Pop Instrumental Performance". This song, along with Glenn Frey's number two hit "You Belong to the City", put the Miami Vice soundtrack on the top of the US album chart for 11 weeks in 1985, making it the most successful TV soundtrack of all time until 2006, when Disney Channel's High School Musical beat its record.

Versions
The 1:55-minute version that aired with the pilot. The famous synthesized guitar lead hook is absent from it, and it features distinct synth guitar notes in its midsection.
The 0:57 version in the following 3 regular episodes, which only contains the percussion and keyboards, without the synth guitar hook. It was essentially a shortened version of the pilot, although it already featured the same melody progression and conclusion at its end as in all the later episodes.

According to Jan Hammer's manager Elliot Sears, the missing guitar lead hook was the result of the sound elements not being mixed together as Hammer intended.

The 1:00 synth guitar hook version that aired with all later episodes. It was first introduced at the end of the first regular episode, Heart of Darkness, over the closing credits, albeit with the guitar hook slightly more muted than in future episodes.
The 2:26 full radio airplay version, the final 55 seconds of which are very similar to the 1:00 TV version.
An extended dance remix, released in 1985 as a 12" single containing two different length versions (in addition to the original version of the theme).

Music video
The music video of the theme is a mini-episode of the TV series with Hammer as a fugitive on the run from James "Sonny" Crockett and Ricardo Tubbs. Throughout the majority of the video, Hammer performs the theme in front of a projector screen playing footage from the TV series – including scenes of the Vice duo chasing him. In the end of the video, he boards a helicopter and escapes from Crockett's sight. The video also shows shots of Fairlight CMI screens including the page R (sequencer) page and the waveform page.

Track listing
7" MCA / MCAP1000 (UK picture disc)
"Miami Vice Theme" – 2:26
"Miami Vice Theme" (TV version) – 1:00
"Miami Vice Theme" (12" edit) – 4:30

12" MCA / MCAT1000 (UK)
"Miami Vice Theme" (Extended Remix) – 6:54
"Miami Vice Theme" (TV version) – 1:00
"Miami Vice Theme" (12" edit) – 4:30

Remix and 12" edit done by Louis Silas, Jr.

7" Mastered by Greg Fulginiti

Chart performance

Weekly charts

Year-end charts

Appearances
Miami Vices pilot episode, made as a two-hour TV movie, did not originally have a theme, but the musical sounds and notation that would become the theme were present as background score. When the series got picked up, Hammer created the 60-second version of the theme. The synth-guitar lead was missing in the aired version of the pilot and the first batch of episodes, and this unfinished version of the theme has remained attached to those episodes, even on the DVD video box set released in 2005.

See also
List of Billboard Hot 100 number-one singles of 1985
List of Cash Box Top 100 number-one singles of 1985

References

1985 singles
1985 songs
1980s instrumentals
Billboard Hot 100 number-one singles
Cashbox number-one singles
Theme
Television drama theme songs